The Hollies are an English pop/rock band from Manchester. Formed in December 1962, the group originally included vocalist Allan Clarke, lead guitarist Vic Steele, rhythm guitarist and vocalist Graham Nash, bassist Eric Haydock and drummer Don Rathbone. The band has since been through numerous lineup changes, and currently includes lead guitarist and vocalist Tony Hicks, drummer Bobby Elliott (both since 1963), bassist and vocalist Ray Stiles (from 1986 to 1990, and since 1991), keyboardist Ian Parker (since 1991), lead vocalist and guitarist Peter Howarth, and guitarist and vocalist Steve Lauri (both since 2004).

History

1962–1981
The Hollies were formed in autumn 1962 by childhood friends Allan Clarke (lead vocals, harmonica) and Graham Nash (rhythm guitar, vocals), who enlisted lead guitarist Vic Steele, bassist Eric Haydock and drummer Don Rathbone for the original lineup. In February 1963, Steele decided he did not want to be a professional musician and left the band, who replaced him with Tony Hicks from Ricky Shaw and the Dolphins. After the group released their first two singles – "(Ain't That) Just Like Me" and "Searchin'" – Rathbone was replaced in August by another Dolphins member, Bobby Elliott. The lineup of Clarke, Nash, Hicks, Haydock and Elliott remained stable for almost three years, releasing Stay with The Hollies and In The Hollies Style in 1964, Hollies in 1965 and Would You Believe? in 1966.

In early 1966, Haydock refused to attend recording sessions due to a dispute with the band's management over earnings. He was replaced in July by Bernie Calvert, another former bandmate of Hicks and Elliott, who had earlier filled in for Haydock on a European tour and the recording of "Bus Stop". After a string of successful releases, Nash left The Hollies on 7 December 1968 to relocate to Los Angeles, California, and form Crosby, Stills & Nash with former Byrds member David Crosby and former Buffalo Springfield member Stephen Stills. Terry Sylvester left the Swinging Blue Jeans to take Nash's place the following month. Clarke remained until November 1971, when he was replaced by Swedish singer Mikael Rickfors after leaving to pursue a solo career. Clarke returned in June 1973 as lead vocalist.

Beginning in 1974, The Hollies toured with a sixth member on keyboards. First in the role was prolific session contributor Pete Wingfield, who remained a member of the touring lineup for three years. He also contributed to the albums Hollies, Write On, A Crazy Steal and Five Three One - Double Seven O Four. Later touring keyboardists included Paul Bliss, and Hans-Peter Arnesen, who recorded parts for A Crazy Steal and more.

1981–2000
In May 1981, both Calvert and Sylvester left the Hollies after the group began working with new producer Bruce Welch, rhythm guitarist of the Shadows. Speaking about the event, Calvert noted he was omitted from a recording session by Welch, after which he decided to leave following a phone call from Sylvester, who informed him of his intention to quit. Sylvester has recalled that he made his decision after an argument within the band, caused by a vote to stop working with long-time manager Robin Britten, with which he disagreed. Sylvester left first, with Calvert following a few days later. Clarke, Hicks and Elliott continued recording with a number of session musicians, including keyboardist Brian Chatton on their next single "Take My Love and Run", and bassist Alan Jones on its B-side "Driver".

The remaining Hollies reunited with original members Graham Nash and Eric Haydock in September 1981 for an appearance on Top of the Pops promoting "Holliedaze". The following month, it was confirmed that Nash would remain with the group for a new studio album. Recording for What Goes Around... began in March the next year, wrapping up by February 1983. The four-piece lineup toured in promotion of the album, with guitarist Alan Coates, bassist Steve Stroud, and keyboardists Bliss and Arnesen joining them for the performances. After the conclusion of the tour, Nash left, Coates and Stroud were made permanent members, and Denis Haines joined on keyboards. The new lineup released their first single, "Too Many Hearts Get Broken", on Columbia Records in May 1985.

Ray Stiles replaced Stroud in the spring of 1986, debuting with the band in June. The following year saw the release of "This Is It" and "Reunion of the Hearts", and in 1988 the band registered on the German charts with "Stand by Me" and "Shine Silently". Stroud returned alongside new keyboardist Dave Carey in 1990 for a cover of Prince's "Purple Rain", although by the next year the pair had been replaced by Stiles and Ian Parker, respectively. The lineup remained constant throughout the 1990s, releasing "The Woman I Love" and "Nothing Else But Love" in 1993, recording a new version of "He Ain't Heavy, He's My Brother" with the cast of Coronation Street in 1995, and contributing a recording of "Peggy Sue Got Married" to Not Fade Away (Remembering Buddy Holly) in 1996.

2000 onwards
Allan Clarke left The Hollies in March 2000, after retiring from touring at the end of the previous year, leaving Hicks and Elliott the only 'classic lineup' members remaining. He was replaced by Carl Wayne, former frontman of the Move. Wayne's only recording with the band was "How Do I Survive", which was released on the 2003 compilation album Greatest Hits, before he died on 31 August 2004 of oesophageal cancer. According to the band's official website, "It was Carl's wish for The Hollies Autumn Tour to go ahead"; accordingly, Peter Howarth took his place. Coates chose to leave The Hollies shortly after Wayne's death, with Steve Lauri brought in as his replacement. The band has since released two new studio albums: Staying Power in 2006 and Then, Now, Always in 2009.

Members

Current

Former

Touring

Timeline

Lineups

References

External links
Official website

Hollies, The